The Garcia School is a historic school building in Wickenburg, Arizona, and is considered to be the best example of a brick one-room schoolhouse surviving in the state.

The Garcia School, also known as the Little Red Schoolhouse or the Garcia Little Red Schoolhouse, was built of red brick in 1905 on land donated by a local pioneer named Don Ignacio Garcia, who is now considered to be the "father of Wickenburg education". It replaced a small wooden schoolhouse that was moved from Vulture City, Arizona, in 1895, and cost $1,600 to build.

The Garcia School was used by students until as late as the 1970s and was added to the National Register of Historic Places on April 1, 1982. It was badly burned in a fire in 1978, but was restored in 1984 and used as a Community Bank of Arizona building until 2003, when it was donated to the Wickenburg Cultural Organization (WCO). It is now used as a local history museum, the office for the WCO, and by the Wickenburg Chamber Orchestra for musical education.

See also

 Little Red Schoolhouse
 National Register of Historic Places in Maricopa County, Arizona

References

Schools in Maricopa County, Arizona
School buildings completed in 1905
1905 establishments in Arizona Territory
History of Maricopa County, Arizona
School buildings on the National Register of Historic Places in Arizona
Schoolhouses in Arizona
One-room schoolhouses in Arizona
National Register of Historic Places in Maricopa County, Arizona